Resurs-P No.1 is a Russian commercial earth observation satellite capable of acquiring high-resolution imagery (resolution up to 1.0 m). The spacecraft is operated by Roscosmos as a replacement of the Resurs-DK No.1 satellite.

The satellite is designed for multi-spectral remote sensing of the Earth's surface aimed at acquiring high-quality visible images in near real-time as well as on-line data delivery via radio link and providing a wide range of consumers with value-added processed data.

In January 2022 it was revealed by the general director of Progress Rocket Space Centre Dimitriy Baranov that the satellite had been decommissioned in December 2021 because of "the failure of onboard equipment".

See also

Resurs-P

References

External links
 Roscosmos official website 
 Resurs-P remote sensing satellite - RussianSpaceWeb.com

Reconnaissance satellites of Russia
Spacecraft launched by Soyuz-2 rockets
Spacecraft launched in 2013
Spacecraft decommissioned in 2021